Paula Harvey (born 12 June 1975) is an Australian sprint canoeist who competed in the early to mid-2000s. She won a bronze medal in the K-4 1000 m event at the 2003 ICF Canoe Sprint World Championships in Gainesville.

Harvey also competed in the K-2 500 m event at the 2004 Summer Olympics in Athens, but was eliminated in the semifinals.

References

Sports-reference.com profile

1975 births
Australian female canoeists
Canoeists at the 2004 Summer Olympics
Living people
Olympic canoeists of Australia
ICF Canoe Sprint World Championships medalists in kayak
21st-century Australian women